Zapotitlán is a municipality in the Jutiapa Department of Guatemala.

Municipalities of the Jutiapa Department